Kelly Nelon Clark (born December 1, 1959) is an inspirational Christian and southern gospel vocalist. She is associated with Bill Gaither's Homecoming events. Nelon Clark along with her family group, The Nelons, were inducted into the Gospel Music Association's Hall of Fame in 2016. She has won Singing News Fan Awards in the categories of Favorite Alto and Favorite Female Vocalist in 1980, 1981, 1982, 1987, and 1990.

Career 
Nelon Clark is from Atlanta, Georgia and was raised in Smyrna, Georgia. Her her father, Rex Nelon, was a gospel singer. Nelon Clark was invited to join the southern gospel group The LeFevres, now Nelons, when she was young, and has sung with them for more than 40 years. She sings alto.

She recorded solo albums while traveling with the Nelons, including Her Father's Child in 1983, Praise Him Now in 1985, Called By Love in 1988, KNT in 1990, and Steadfast Heart in 1992.

Nelon Clark has appeared in the television shows Resurrection and Homicide Hunter, where she played the role of Carol Parmer. She also starred in the movies The Old Rugged Cross and His Love Is Blind.

Personal life
Nelon Clark was married to Jerry Thompson, the former lead singer of the Nelons, for almost 20 years; they divorced in 1998. She has two daughters, Amber and Autumn, who sing with the Nelons today.

Nelon Clark remarried in 2001 to Jason Clark, now the lead singer of the Nelons.

Discography

Solo albums
 1983: Her Father's Child
 1985: Praise Him Now
 1988: Called By Love
 1990: KNT
 1992: Steadfast Heart

With the LeFevres
1975: Experience The LeFevres
1976: Gospel Music U.S.A.
1977: Sing Your Request 
1977: Singing 'Till He Comes

With the Rex Nelon Singers
1977: I've Never Been This Homesick Before 
1977: The Sun's Coming Up 
1978: Live 
1979: Feelings 
1980: Expressions Of Love 
1980: One More Song 
1980: Sing the Gospel 
1981: One Step Closer 
1982: Feeling at Home 
1983: We Shall Behold the King
1984: The Best & A Whole Lot More

As the Nelons
 1985: In One Accord
 1986: Journeys
 1987: Thanks
 1988: Get Ready
 1989: Let The Redeemed Say So
 1990: The Best of Times
 1991: One Less Stone
 1991: A New Generation
 1992: Right On Time
 1993: Kelly Nelon Thompson & The Nelons
 1994: A Promised Reunion
 1994: He's My Comfort
 1994: Triumphant
 1995: Hallelujah Live
 1996: We're Glad You're Here
 1997: We've Got To Praise Him
 1997: Thanks Live
 1997: All Rise Live
 1998: Peace Within The Walls
 1999: A Journey
 2000: Following After
 2001: Season of Song 1 Nelon Classics
 2002: United for Christ
 2003: Season of Song 2
 2004: The Light of Home
 2008: You Are God
 2010: Beside Still Waters
 2011: Come On Home
 2012: Evening in December
 2014: Hymns: The A Capella Sessions
 2016: Stronger Together EP

Guest appearances on other albums
1985: First Call - An Evening In December, song "Evening In December""

References

External links 
 Official site

Southern gospel performers
1959 births
People from Atlanta
American actresses
Living people
21st-century American women